The Dead Mountains are a mountain range in the southeastern Mojave Desert, in San Bernardino County, California. The range borders the tri-state intersection of Nevada, Arizona and California, and the Mohave Valley, with the Fort Mojave Indian Reservation bordering the range foothills on the east and northeast, in the three states.

Geography
They border the Colorado River on the east, and the Piute Wash of the Piute Valley on the west.

Dead Mountains Wilderness
The rust colored mountains, which cover 46,758 acres, were designated the Dead Mountains Wilderness in 1994 by the United States Congress as part of the California Desert Protection Act of 1994. They are maintained by the Bureau of Land Management. The vegetation is mostly creosote bush and desert wash scrub. The California Desert Conservation Area is located within the wilderness and smoke trees are found there.

The wildlife found on the mountains includes coyote, a small herd of bighorn sheep, rattlesnakes, falcons, hawks, eagles. A portion of the wilderness is critical habitat for the endangered desert tortoise.

See also
 Category: Flora of the California desert regions
 Category: Mountain ranges of the Mojave Desert
 Category: Protected areas of the Mojave Desert

References

External links
 Official Dead Mountains Wilderness Area website
 California Desert Conservation Area website

Piute Valley
Mountain ranges of the Mojave Desert
Mountain ranges of the Lower Colorado River Valley
Protected areas of the Mojave Desert
Mountain ranges of San Bernardino County, California
Bureau of Land Management areas in California
Mountain ranges of Clark County, Nevada
Mountain ranges of Nevada